Oxberry may refer to:

Places
Oxberry, Mississippi, an unincorporated community located in Grenada County

People with the surname
Dianne Oxberry (1967–2019), English broadcaster and weather presenter
William Oxberry (1784–1824), English actor, writer, and publisher
 John Oxberry (1918–1974) founder of Oxberry LLC, and inventor; see Rostrum camera